Joey Iest (born February 12, 2003) is an American professional stock car racing driver. He competes part-time in the ARCA Menards Series West, driving the No. 54 Ford Fusion for Naake-Klauer Motorsports.

Racing career

Early career 
Joey started racing in 2012, at nine years old, after his grandfather bought him a used quarter midget. He had raced at his local home track, Madera Speedway. He didn't have any background coming into racing but got help from trainer Rusty Lomier throughout his five years of racing in quarter midgets.

Throughout 2012 to 2016, Joey has competed in Senior Honda, Light 160, and Light World Formula events, and finished off his quarter midget career with two national championships.

Joey moved up to USAC HPD Focus Midget Series in 2017, racing at Madera Speedway. He would win Rookie of the Year in his first season.

Joey returned to the HPD Focus Midget Series in 2018, competing on dirt and asphalt tracks. He was allowed to drive a junior late model race at Madera Speedway for Naake-Klauer Motorsports later in the year. He started in the back but managed to finish in 6th. He would go on to drive the final 4 races of the 2018 season and would go full-time racing for Naake-Klauer in 2019.

2019 would be a very successful year for Joey, as he won the 51FIFTY Jr. Late Model Series championship with Naake-Klauer Motorsports, along with winning the USAC Western Speed 2 Midget Series championship, getting seven wins in only seven starts.
For 2020, he competed full-time in the SRL Southwest Tour, where he won his first career race at Stockton 99 Speedway, finishing in front of two former SRL champions, Jeremy Doss, and Cole Moore.

ARCA Menards Series West 
On February 11, 2020, one day before his 17th birthday, Joey made his first career ARCA Menards Series West start at The Bullring at Las Vegas Motor Speedway for Naake-Klauer Motorsports. He would start 3rd and finish 14th. He was expected to make four more starts that season, but only made three after withdrawing from the ENEOS 125 at Irwindale Speedway. His best finish from that season would be 11th at The Bullring at Las Vegas Motor Speedway on September 26, 2020.

Joey returned to Naake-Klauer Motorsports for a full-time schedule in the 2021 ARCA Menards Series West season. On July 31, 2021, Joey captured his first career ARCA Menards Series West win at Colorado National Speedway, after leading the final 18 laps.

ARCA Menards Series East 
On December 18, 2020, it was announced that Joey will be driving part-time in the 2021 ARCA Menards Series East season for David Gilliland Racing. He was scheduled to run at least six races for the team but eventually announced he'll be driving the full eight races of the season. He earned six top ten's, with his best finish of 2nd at Southern National Motorsports Park.

ARCA Menards Series 
Joey drove four races in the 2021 ARCA Menards Series season, all of which had a collaboration with ARCA Menards Series East, and ARCA Menards Series West races. His best finish would be 8th at the Milwaukee Mile.

Motorsports career results

ARCA Menards Series

ARCA Menards Series East

ARCA Menards Series West

References

External links 

2003 births
Living people
ARCA Menards Series drivers
NASCAR drivers
Racing drivers from California
Sportspeople from California